The Ainu Times is the only magazine published in the Ainu language, hosted by the Ainu Pen Club. Its first edition was published for 20 March 1997. It uses both special katakana and romanizations in its articles. Its editor as of 2006 is guitarist Takashi Hamada. It is published four times a year. A Japanese version of each issue, containing Japanese translations of the issue's contents, is published three months after the issue's initial publication.

References

External links
 Ainu Times homepage (by Takasi Hamada, in Ainu and Japanese) (Geocities page, Archived 24 October 2009)
 オタルナイ・レコード (Archived 24 October 2009) (includes pages on Ainu Times)
 cakcak kamuy oruspe (example of Ainu Times, in Ainu, Japanese and Esperanto, by Yokoyama Hiroyuki, a member of Hokkaido Esperanto League (HEL) in Japan)

1997 establishments in Japan
Ainu mass media
Ainu languages
Lifestyle magazines published in Japan
Magazines established in 1997
Quarterly magazines